Catcall is a children's novel by Linda Newbery, published in 2006. It won the Nestlé Children's Book Prize Silver Award.

Plot
The story focuses on a young boy named Josh, whose family goes through a dramatic upheaval. There is a new stepdad and a new baby sister.

Josh's younger brother Jamie takes this badly and soon develops an obsession with wild cats and a refusal to speak. Josh uses all his skills, and a cat scrapbook, to help his family heal.

References

2006 British novels
British children's novels
2006 children's books
Orion Books books